Bert Graf (2 August 1896 – 1 September 1968) was an Australian rules footballer who played for the Carlton Football Club in the Victorian Football League (VFL).

Notes

External links 
		
Bert Graf's profile at Blueseum		
 

1896 births
1968 deaths
Australian rules footballers from Victoria (Australia)
Carlton Football Club players